HuntonBrady is a modern architecture and interior design firm based in Orlando, Florida. It was founded by Robert B. Murphy in 1947 and has received more than 50 American Institute of Design Awards. The practice's specialties include healthcare, education and commercial office design.

Robert Murphy grew up in Charleston, South Carolina, and earned his first architectural degree from Clemson in 1936. He entered Harvard's Graduate School of Design a year after Walter Gropius became Dean of the school and graduated with a master's degree in 1940. He served in the Army Air Corps during World War II. After the war he settled in Orlando and established his namesake architectural firm: Robert B. Murphy, Architect in January 1947. He added partners Tom Hunton, Claude Shivers, and Clyde Brady in the 1960s making firm Murphy Hunton Shivers & Brady by the time he retired in 1979. Continuing on as Hunton Shivers & Brady, the firm briefly merged with a Tampa firm in the mid-1980s to become DesignArts, but soon reversed the merger and reorganized as Hunton Brady Pryor Maso with the addition of principal architects Fred Pryor and Maurizio Maso. The firm eventually made its name HuntonBrady to maintain continuity as principals died or retired. Chuck Cole served as President after Pryor's death in 2005 and Steve Belflower became President upon Cole's retirement in 2017.

Recent projects
Florida Hospital Orlando Ginsburg Patient Tower, 15-story building near downtown Orlando
University of Central Florida College of Medicine
Seminole Community College's Heathrow Technology Center 
Seminole Community College Altamonte Springs campus
University of Central Florida College of Medicine

Past projects
City of Orlando Firehouse at Marks & Ferncreek - 1950s
American Federal Building, Orlando located across from City Hall on Orange Avenue (subsequent stories were added later) - 1960s 
Central Branch of the YMCA, Orlando - 1960s 
University of Central Florida campus buildings; the Science Building, the Library Building, the Student Center and  dormitories (1970s) in east Orlando 
Central Florida at The Springs (1970s) community's first patio homes 
Valencia Community College campus buildings (1970s) on Kirkman Road
Sabal Center (1980s)
Maitland Colonnades (1980s) 
Southtrust Bank Building (1980s) 
2600 Maitland Center (1980s)
Team Disney Corporate Headquarters building (1980s) with Arata Isozaki  
Orange County Convention Center Phase III Addition - 1990s 
Heathrow International Business Center buildings (1990s), off I-4
Fiserv CBS worldwide headquarters (2000s), Lake Mary, Florida

References

Architecture firms based in Florida